Hattie Starr was an American songwriter popular in the late 19th and early 20th century.

Her best known song and a popular hit of its day was "Little Alabama Coon" (1893). It was a coon song, but not considered racist or negative at the time compared to more coarse vaudeville fare, even being recorded by Mabel Garrison of the New York Metropolitan Opera.

Originally an actress, her songwriting proved successful enough that she left the stage.  Her other compositions included Somebody Loves Me which was successfully performed by Josephine Sabel.

References

External links

Little Alabama Coon, sheet music at Levy Sheet Music Collection
Somebody Loves Me,  sheet music at Levy Sheet Music Collection

American women songwriters
Place of birth missing
Year of birth missing
Year of death missing